Maida is an Arbëreshë town and comune in the province of Catanzaro, in the Calabria region of southern Italy. The British routed the French in the Battle of Maida in 1806, as part of the War of the Third Coalition.

History
On 4 July 1806 the British under General John Stuart defeated the French under Jean Reynier outside the town at the Battle of Maida. A London pub on the Edgware Road was named The Hero of Maida, which in turn gave its name to the adjoining London districts, Maida Hill and, later, Maida Vale. King Ferdinand IV of Naples and Sicily awarded Stuart the title of Count of Maida.

The Norman castle of Maida was built in the 11th century under the direction of Duke Robert Guiscard.

Famous citizens
 Mgr Giovanni Cervadoro, the Carbonaro and teacher, was born in Maida in 1783 and died in 1836, and wrote School Stabilimenti for his students in 1829.
 Baldassarre Squitti, the teacher and politician, was born in Maida in 1855. 
 The American writer Gay Talese wrote about his ancestors from Maida in his 1992 book Unto the Sons.
 Giuseppe Donato, sculptor and protégé of Auguste Rodin, was born in Maida in 1881 and died in Philadelphia, Pennsylvania, in 1965.

Economy
The main economic activity in the area is agriculture, especially the cultivation of olive trees, citrus, and kiwifruit. In recent years, tourism has become a significant source of income.

Sister cities 
Maida is a sister city with:
  Ambler, Pennsylvania, United States

References

External links
 Photos of Maida at Saint Francis Society of Ambler, Pennsylvania, United States
 

Arbëresh settlements
Cities and towns in Calabria